Eulenspiegel (Ulenspiegel, Ulenspegel, Uilenspiegel) or Till Eulenspiegel (Dyl Ulenspiegel and variants) may refer to:

 Till Eulenspiegel, a prankster in German folklore

Literature
 Eulenspiegel (magazine) - a satirical magazine in Germany, formerly in East Germany
 Ulenspiegel (magazine), a defunct satirical magazine in postwar Germany, published December 1945–1950
 Eulenspiegel, a light novel by Tow Ubukata
 Thyl Ulenspiegel (The Legend of Thyl Ulenspiegel and Lamme Goedzak), (1868), by Charles De Coster

Music
 Ulenspiegel (opera), by Walter Braunfels
 Till Eulenspiegel (Karetnikov)
 Till Eulenspiegel's Merry Pranks, a tone poem by Richard Strauss
Wie Till Eulenspiegel lebte, by Emil von Reznicek (1860-1945)
Uilenspiegel, de geus  ballet Op.67 (1976) by Willem Kersters
Thyl Uilenspiegel, symphonic poem (1927) by Flor Alpaerts

See also
The Eulenspiegel Society - a BDSM support group in New York City